Some Kinda Fun is the third studio album by Teenage Head, released in 1982. It was one of the Top 100 albums in Canada of 1982. The album was certified Gold in Canada on April 28, 2014.

Track listing

Personnel 
Frankie Venom (Kerr) - vocals, harmonica
Gordon Lewis - guitar
Steve Mahon - bass
Nick Stipanitz - drums, vocals, backing vocals

Production
Brian Christian - producer
Ringo Hyrcyna - engineer
Hayward Parrott - remix engineer
David Bendeth - mixing
Recorded at Nimbus/Sound Stage Studios, Toronto
Remixed at Manta Sound, Toronto

Chart positions

Album

Singles

References 

1982 albums
Teenage Head (band) albums